Iribe is a surname of different origins. It may be of Basque or Japanese (入部) origin. Notable people with the surname include:

Abraham Velázquez Iribe (born 1953), Mexican politician
Brendan Iribe (born 1979), American computer programmer and businessman
Paul Iribe (1883–1935), French illustrator and designer
Shōtarō Iribe (born 1989), Japanese cyclist

See also

Irbe (disambiguation)

References

Japanese-language surnames
Basque-language surnames